Macromphalus is a genus of very small sea snails, marine gastropod mollusks or micromollusks in the family Vanikoridae.

Species
Species within the genus Macromphalus include:

 Macromphalus abylensis
 Macromphalus aculeatus (Hedley, 1900)
 Macromphalus asperus (Hedley, 1912)
 Macromphalus backeljaui Poppe, Tagaro & Stahlschmidt, 2015
 Macromphalus citharella (Cossmann, 1888) †
 Macromphalus decussatus (A. Adams, 1860)
 Macromphalus disjunctus (de Raincourt & Munier-Chalmas, 1863) †
 Macromphalus fischeri (de Laubrière, 1881) †
 Macromphalus gracilis (Brazier, 1894)
 Macromphalus incertus (Turton, 1932)
 Macromphalus mzambanus (Kilburn, 1977)
 Macromphalus pasithea (Kilburn, 1977)
 Macromphalus saharicus Rubio & Rolan, 1994
 Macromphalus senegalensis (Knudsen, 1956)
 Macromphalus styliferinus (Nevill, 1884)
 Macromphalus subreticulatus (Nevill, 1884)
 Macromphalus thelacme (Melvill, 1904)
 Macromphalus walkeri Poppe, Tagaro & Stahlschmidt, 2015
 Macromphalus yamamotoi (Habe, 1978)
Species brought into synonymy
  † Macromphalus decussatus (Cossmann, 1888): synonym of  † Macromphalina decussata (Cossmann, 1888)

References

 Gofas, S.; Le Renard, J.; Bouchet, P. (2001). Mollusca. in: Costello, M.J. et al. (Ed.) (2001). European register of marine species: a check-list of the marine species in Europe and a bibliography of guides to their identification. Collection Patrimoines Naturels. 50: pp. 180–213.

External links

Vanikoridae